Skakavac Waterfall is located near Mrkonjić Grad in western Bosnia and Herzegovina. River Skakavac, from which occurs the mentioned waterfall is one of the small rivers that flow into the Balkana Lake.

References 

Waterfalls of Bosnia and Herzegovina